Irving Washington Pratt (1838–1908) was an educator in the U.S. state of Oregon. He was Superintendent of Schools for Portland, Oregon from 1891 to 1896. He was also a prominent Freemason and a Shriner.

The liberty ship SS Irving W. Pratt was named for him.

References

Educators from Portland, Oregon
1838 births
1908 deaths
Portland Public Schools (Oregon)
19th-century American educators